Growing Up Hip Hop is the original installment of the Growing Up Hip Hop reality television franchise on WE tv. The series premiered on January 7, 2016, and chronicles the lives of the children of hip hop legends. Its success has led to the creation of spin-offs Growing Up Hip Hop: Atlanta and Growing Up Hip Hop: New York. The series is executive produced by Datari Turner Productions and Entertainment One Studios. On December 29, 2022, WE tv announced the show's return for a seventh and the final season which premiered on January 5, 2023.

Cast

Main

Current
 Romeo Miller (Seasons 1–5, 7) 
 Son of Master P and brother of Cymphonique Miller. Miller's career began with the release of his debut studio Lil' Romeo at the age of 11, which led to other opportunities including his own Nickelodeon sitcom, Romeo!, running from 2003 to 2006. Miller appeared on Dancing with the Stars during its twelfth season. In 2016, Miller appeared on Empire during its third season as Gram. The series chronicles his business ventures with his father. He broke up with his ex-fiance of Angela in the fifth season. He quit the show. He rejoined the show for season 7.

 Angela Simmons 
Daughter of Rev Run of Run–D.M.C. and sister of Vanessa Simmons. Simmons first gained public attention when she appeared with her family on the reality TV series Run's House. She has made a name for herself by making a clothing line. The third season chronicles her struggles of connecting with her family after becoming a mother. He's like the new music career in the seventh season.  

 Egypt Criss 
Daughter of Pepa of Salt-n-Pepa and Treach of Naughty by Nature and wife of Sammattick. Criss has the desire to create a name for herself musically. 

 Vanessa Simmons (Season 3–present) (supporting cast member in season 2) (guest star in season 1)
Daughter of Rev Run of Run–D.M.C. and sister of Angela Simmons. Simmons first gained public attention when she appeared with her family on the reality TV series Run's House. In the third season, she struggles to become closer to Angela.

 Briana Latrise (Season 4–present) (supporting cast member in seasons 2–3)
Daughter of Kendu Isaacs. In the second season, Briana deals with an abusive relationship. The third season chronicles the fallout from the breakup of her father and Mary J. Blige. Boogie's ex-lover and Lil' Eazy-E's love interest.

 Tahira "Tee Tee" Francis-Rogers (Season 4–present) (supporting cast member in season 3)
Niece of Pepa. In the third season, Tee Tee goes to LA to watch over Egypt as Pepa goes on tour again, however, she becomes involved in a lot of drama.

 Jojo Simmons (Season 5–present) (supporting cast member in season 4)
Son of Rev Run and brother of Vanessa and Angela. Jojo will be joining the cast of Growing Up Hip Hop: New York along with his father.   

 Cree Campbell (Season 6–present)
Daughter of Uncle Luke.

 Sammattick (Season 7—present) (supporting cast member in seasons 3—6) 
 Husband of Egypt Criss. 

 Layzie Bone (Season 7—present) (supporting cast member in season 6) 
 Rapper and member of Bone Thugs-n-Harmony. 

 Sakoya Wynter (Season 7—present) (supporting cast member in season 6) 
 Daughter of Joel "JoJo" Hailey and baby's mama of Daniel Jacobs. 

 Lil Twist (Season 7—present) (supporting cast member in seasons 4—6) 
 Rapper. He is currently signed to Young Money. 

 Tyran Denton (Season 7—present) (supporting cast member in seasons 5—6) 
 Son of Pepa and brother of Egypt. 

 Shawn Rogers (Season 7—present) (supporting cast member in seasons 5—6) 
 Husband of Tee Tee. 

 Lil Eazy E (Season 7—present) (supporting cast member in seasons 4—6) 
 Son of Eazy-E. Real name Eric Wright, Jr., he was previously in a relationship with Briana. 

 Bow Wow (Season 7—present) (supporting cast member in season 3—5) 
 Angela's ex-boyfriend & fiancee. In the third season, Bow Wow tries to rekindle his friendship with Angela. Bow Wow is also main cast 
member of Growing Up Hip Hop: Atlanta.

Former
 Kristinia DeBarge (Seasons 1–4)
Daughter of James DeBarge of DeBarge. DeBarge followed in her family's footsteps and went into music. DeBarge's debut single Goodbye released in 2009, went platinum and released an album Exposed along with it. DeBarge has continued to make music over the years. She has the desire to find out if she has a half-sister whose mother would be Janet Jackson beginning in the second season. The third season chronicles her desire to put out music, but faces rumors about sleeping with her producer.

 TJ Mizell (Seasons 1–2) (supporting cast member in season 3)
Son of Jam Master Jay of Run–D.M.C.

 Damon "Boogie" Dash (Seasons 1—6) 
Son of Linda Williams and music mogul / fashion designer Damon Dash. The second and third seasons showcase his struggle with drinking 
alcohol and hiding DUIS. 

 Savannah Jordan (Season 6—present) 
Daughter of Stevie J and new love interest of Boogie.

Supporting

Current
 Pepa 
Mother of Egypt Criss. Pepa is a part of the female rap trio Salt-n-Pepa. Pepa serves as a support system for Egypt and looks out for her well-being. They clash about Egypt's singing career plan throughout the series.

Rev Run (Seasons 1—6)
Father of Angela and Vanessa Simmons. Rev Run was a part of the hip hop group Run–D.M.C. Rev Run helps Angela with her stalker situation in the first season. Run will be joining the cast of the spin-off Growing Up Hip Hop: New York along with his son Jojo.

 Tanice Amira (Season 5–present) (guest appearance in season 4)
Fiance & Wife of Jojo Simmons.

 Treach (Season 5–present) (guest appearance in seasons 1–4)  
Father of Egypt.

 Uncle Luke (Season 6–present) 
 Father of Cree. Uncle Luke is a rapper who was the lead rapper of 2 Live Crew.

 Devin Hailey (Season 6—present) 
 Son of Cedric "K-Ci" Hailey is a rapper. 

 Joel "JoJo" Hailey (Season 7—present) (guest in season 6) 
 Father of Sakoya Wynter. 

 Tashaunda "Tiny" Hailey (Seasons 6—7—present) 
 Mother of Sakoya Wynter and ex-wife of Joel "JoJo" Hailey. 

 Buck (Season 7—present) 
 Stepfather of Tanice and rival of JoJo Simmons. 

 Drew Sangster (Season 7—present) 
 Girlfriend and baby's mama of Romeo Miller.  

 Cedric "K-Ci" Hailey (Season 7—present) 
 Father of Devin Hailey.

Aaliyah Wright (Season 7—present) (guest in seasons 5—6)  
Wife of Lil Eazy E.

Former
 Master P (Seasons 1–5)
Father of Romeo Miller. Master P is a rapper from New Orleans who is best known for his singles "Mr. Ice Cream Man" and "Make 'Em Say Uhh!". Master P supports Romeo throughout the series, while also clashing with him when it comes to business deals.

 Damon Dash (Seasons 1–5)
Father of Boogie Dash. Damon is one of the founders of Roc-A-Fella Records Damon makes sure his son stays on the right path.

 Andre King (Season 2)
Brother of Swizz Beatz. The second season showcased King coming out to his friends and family.

 Kyndall Ferguson (Season 4)
Daughter of El DeBarge and cousin of Kristinia.

 Raquel Horn (Seasons 4–5) (guest appearance in season 3)
Girlfriend of Damon Dash. Also known as Rocky.

 Ava Dash (Season 5) (guest appearance in seasons 3–4)
Daughter of Damon Dash and sister of Boogie Dash.

 Troy (Season 5) (guest appearance in seasons 3–4)
Former hairstylist and friend of Pepa.

 Maureen "Aunt Bev" (Seasons 5—6) 
Mother of Tee Tee and sister of Pepa. 

 Stevie J (Season 6—present)
Father of Savannah, Dorian and Steven, Jr. Stevie is a record producer who has worked multiple artists including Mariah Carey, Eve, The Notorious B.I.G. and Jay-Z. 

 Steven Jordan, Jr. (Season 6—present) 
Son of Stevie J and brother of Savannah and Dorian.

Episodes

Series overview

Season 1 (2016)

Season 2 (2016)

Season 3 (2017)

Season 4 (2018–19)

Season 5 (2019–20)

Season 6 (2021–22)

Season 7 (2023)

Spin-offs

Growing Up Hip Hop: Atlanta
The first spin-off titled Growing Up Hip Hop: Atlanta premiered on May 25, 2017.

Growing Up Hip Hop: New York
The second spin-off titled Growing Up Hip Hop: New York premiered on August 29, 2019.

References

External links

 
 
 

2010s American reality television series
2016 American television series debuts
Hip hop television
African-American reality television series
2020s American reality television series